Keying may refer to:
 Keying (electrical connector), used by electrical connectors to prevent mating in incorrect orientation
 Keying (graphics), a technique for compositing two full frame images together
 Keying (official) (1787–1858),  a Manchu statesman during the Qing dynasty
 Keying (ship), a Chinese junk which sailed to the U.S. and Britain in 1847–1848, named after the official
 Keying (telecommunications), a form of modulation where the modulating signal takes one of two or more values at all times
 Keying, vandalism of a painted surface by scratching it with a key

See also 
 Key (disambiguation)